Westereendersk is a local variety of Wood Frisian and is spoken in De Westereen, Zwagerbosch and Twijzelerheide. The most remarkable feature is the use of ee  where Wood Frisian and most other West Frisian dialects use ei or ij .

Examples 

This phenomenon can also be found back in other parts of the Frisian Woods.

De Westereen 

When the municipality of Dantumadiel chose for West Frisian names as official topographical names it was decided to replace the Dutch name Zwaagwesteinde by De Westereen instead of De Westerein. Towns like Zwagerbosch and Twijzelerheide also speak "Westereender Frisian". 

However the village is called De Westerein by most other Frisians, its inhabitants are often called Westereenders.

West Frisian language
Achtkarspelen
Noardeast-Fryslân
Dantumadiel